Meiacanthus crinitus, the hairytail fangblenny, is a species of combtooth blenny found in the western Pacific ocean, around Indonesia.  This species grows to a length of  TL.

References

crinitus
Fish described in 1987